Astele similaris is a species of sea snail, a marine gastropod mollusk in the family Calliostomatidae.

Description
The height of the shell varies between 22 mm and 35 mm.

Distribution
This species occurs in the Central Indo-West Pacific.

Notes
Additional information regarding this species:
 Taxonomic remark: Some authors place this taxon in the subgenus Astele (Astele)

References

External links
 To Encyclopedia of Life
 To World Register of Marine Species
 

similaris
Gastropods described in 1863